Retrogaming, also known as classic gaming and old school gaming, is the playing and collection of obsolete personal computers, consoles, and video games. Usually, retrogaming is based upon systems that are outmoded or discontinued, although ported retrogaming allows games to be played on modern hardware via ports or compilations. It is typically for nostalgia, preservation, or authenticity. A new game could be retro styled, such as an RPG with turn-based combat and pixel art in isometric camera perspective.

Retrogaming has existed since the early years of the video game industry, and was popularized with the Internet and emulation technology. It is argued that the main reasons players are drawn to retrogames are nostalgia for different eras, the idea that classic games are more innovative and original, and the simplicity of the games.

Retrogaming and retrocomputing have been described as preservation activity and as aspects of the remix culture.

Etymology 
The first known instance of the term "retro" in gaming came from the online video game store RetroGames, which was launched in 1997 as a joint effort of Turbo Zone Direct and Robert Frasure. It specialized primarily in Turbografx-16, Sega Master System, and NES sales and repairs. This was quickly followed by the emulation website retrogames.com in 1998. The original word was coined by Robert Frasure when he found that "Flashback Games" was taken.

Games 
The distinction between retro and modern is heavily debated, but it usually coincides with either the shift from 2D to 3D games (making the fourth the last retro generation, and the fifth the first modern), the turn of the millennium and the increase in online gaming (making the fifth the last retro generation, and the sixth the first modern), or the switch from analog to digital for audiovisual output and from 4:3 to 16:9 aspect ratio (making the sixth the last retro generation, and the seventh the first modern). They can be played on original hardware or in modern emulation.

Retrogaming methods 
With increasing nostalgia and success of retro compilations in the fifth, sixth, and seventh generations of consoles, retrogaming has become a motif in modern games. Modern retrogames impose limitations on color palette, resolution, and memory well below the actual limits of the hardware, to mimic the look of old hardware. These may be based on a general concept of retro, as with Cave Story, or an attempt to imitate a specific piece of hardware, as with MSX color palette of La Mulana.

This concept, known as deliberate retro and NosCon, gained popularity due part to the independent gaming scene, where the short development time was attractive and commercial viability was not a concern. Major publishers have embraced modern retrogaming with releases such as Mega Man 9 which mimics NES hardware; Retro Game Challenge, a compilation of new games on faux-NES hardware; and Sega's Fantasy Zone II remake, which uses emulated System 16 hardware running on PlayStation 2 to create a 16-bit reimagining of the 8-bit original.

Vintage retrogaming 

Vintage retrogaming can involve collecting original cartridge and disc media and arcade and console hardware, which can be expensive and rare. Most are priced lower than their original retail prices. The popularity of vintage retrogaming has led to counterfeit media, which generally lack collectible value. During the 2020 COVID-19 pandemic, prices for vintage hardware began spiking to much higher levels than pre-pandemic, mostly attributed to the millennial generation pursuing the hobby during the lockdown due to boredom and nostalgia.

Retrogaming emulation 

Retrogaming may involve classic game systems being emulated on modern hardware. It bypasses the need to collect classic consoles and original games. Read-only memory (ROM) files are copied by third parties, directly from the original media. They are then typically put online through file sharing sites. They are often sold as re-releases, typically in compilations containing multiple games running on emulation software. The accessibility of emulation popularized and expanded on retrogaming.

Ported retrogaming 
Ported retrogaming involves original games being converted to native on new systems, just as emulation but without original ROM files. Ported games are available through official collections, console-based downloads, and plug and play systems. Ported retrogaming is comparatively rare, since emulation is a much easier and more accurate method.

Remakes 

Modern retrogaming may be more broadly applied to retro-style designs and reimaginings with more modern graphics. These enhanced remakes include Pac-Man: Championship Edition, Space Invaders Extreme, Super Mega Worm, and 3D Dot Game Heroes. Some are based directly upon the enhanced emulation of original games, as with Nintendo's NES Remix.

When remakes are created by an individual or a group of enthusiasts without commercial motivation, such games sometimes are also called fangames. These are often motivated by the phenomenon of abandonware, which is the discontinuation of sales and support by the original producers. Examples of fan-made remakes are King's Quest I: Quest for the Crown, King's Quest II: Romancing the Stones, and Freeciv.

The nostalgia-based revival of past game styles has also been accompanied by the development of the modern chiptune genre of game music. Chiptunes are characterized by severe limitations of sound imposed by the author's self-restriction to using only the original sound chips from 8-bit or 16-bit games. These compositions are featured in many retro-style modern games and are popular in the demoscene.

Re-releases 
With the new possibility of the online distribution in mid-2000, the commercial distribution of classic games became feasible, as deployment and storage costs dropped significantly: 

A digital distributor specialized in bringing classic games out of abandonware is GOG.com (formerly called Good Old Games) who started 2008 to search for copyright holders of classic games to re-release them legally and DRM-free. Other companies have also been established to rerelease retro games, including Limited Run Games and iam8bit.

Online platforms for classic video game re-releases include Nintendo's Virtual Console and Sony's PlayStation Network.

Mobile application developers have been purchasing the rights and licensing to re-release vintage arcade games on iOS and Android operating systems. Some publishers are creating spinoffs to their classic games, keeping the core gameplay while adding new features, levels, and styles of play.

Plug-and-play systems 
Plug-and-play systems have been released or licensed by companies such as Atari, Sega, and Nintendo. These systems include stand-alone game libraries and plug directly into the user's television.

Retrogaming community 

The retrogaming market is active with online and physical spaces where retrogames are discussed, collected, and played.

Online 
Several websites and online forums are devoted to retrogaming. The content on these online platforms typically includes reviews of classic games, interviews with developers, fan-made content, game walkthroughs, and message boards for discussions. Many gameplay videos posted online feature attempts at breaking speedrun or high score records.

Fighting games 
The competitive Fighting game community comes from arcades, such as Street Fighter and Mortal Kombat. Some fighting games have continued to receive arcade releases after the end of the arcade era.  Face-to-face competition of Super Street Fighter II Turbo has been featured in the Evolution Championship Series.

Exhibitions 
Events typically include vendors, gameplay, tournaments, costumes, and live music.

Museums 
Retrogaming is recognized by museums worldwide.  For example, the RetroGames arcade museum of Karlsruhe, Germany was founded in 2002 and the Computerspielemuseum Berlin was founded in 1997.  Some classical art museums bear a video gaming retrospective, as with 2012's Smithsonian American Art Museum exhibition titled The Art of Video Games or as part of the Museum of Modern Art "Applied Design" exhibition in 2013. Starting in 2015, The Strong National Museum of Play adds games annually to the World Video Game Hall of Fame. In 2016, the first museum dedicated solely to the history of the videogame industry, The National Videogame Museum, was opened in Frisco, Texas.

Legal issues 
Though many abandonware games are freely downloadable on third-party websites, the duration of copyright on creative works in most countries is far longer than the era of home computing.

Emulators are typically created by third parties, and the software they run is often taken directly from the original games and put online for free download. While it is completely legal for anyone to create an emulator for any hardware, unauthorized distribution of the code for a retro game is an infringement of the game's copyright. Some companies have made public statements, such as Nintendo, stating that "the introduction of emulators created to play illegally copied Nintendo software represents the greatest threat to date in the intellectual property rights of video game developers". However, video game developers and publishers typically ignore emulation. One reason for this is that at any given time, most of the games illegally distributed for emulation are not presently being sold by the company which owns the game, and so the financial damages in a successful lawsuit would likely be negligible.

See also 
 Video game collecting
 List of retro style video game consoles
 History of video game consoles
 Halcyon Days: Interviews with Classic Computer and Video Game Programmers
 MAME, multi-system emulator
 Old School Revival
 Retrocomputing

References

External links 
 
 

Nostalgia
Video game culture